Minick is a 1924 Broadway play written by Edna Ferber and George Kaufman.

Minick may also refer to:

 John W. Minick (1908–1944), United States Army soldier and a recipient of the Medal of Honor
 Johnny Minick (born 1955), American gospel singer and songwriter
 Pam Minick (born 1955), rodeo performer, film and television actress
 Pat Minick (1937 or 1938–2017), American drag racer
 Paul Minick (1899–1978), American football player
 Roger Minick (born 1944), American photographer
"Old Man Minick", a 1921 short story by Edna Ferber

See also
 Minnick
 Minich
 Minnich
 Minik (disambiguation)